Honorary degree recipients of NYU are typically persons of great distinction or achievement who are nationally or internationally prominent in their subject areas or disciplines and who reflect the values of New York University. As a whole, the group of honorees vary in their fields of endeavor, and are diverse in ethnicity, race, background, and gender. 
Among some of the distinguished recipients honored in recent years at Commencement are the following: 

 Aretha Franklin (Hall of Fame artist)
Robert Rubin, 70th United States Secretary of the Treasury
 Claire Marie Fraser (Genomicist) 
 Dylan Tilley (Exogeologist, Mineralogist)
 Lang Lang, internationally renowned pianist
 Omara Khan Massoudi, Afghan Museum Director and Preserver of Cultural Patrimony
 Sonia Sotomayor, Associate Justice, United States Supreme Court
 Oliver Stone, film director and NYU Tisch Alum
 David Brooks, columnist for The New York Times
 Patrick Desbois, President, Yahad-In Unum
 Charles Weissmann, Professor and Chairman, Department of Infectology, The Scripps Research Institute
 Janet Yellen, Federal Reserve System Chair
Darren Walker, President of the Ford Foundation.
Emmanuelle Charpentier, scientist whose research led to some of the most important tools for genome “editing”, and Scientific Member and Director of the Max Planck Institute for Infection Biology, and Visiting Professor at Umeå University.
Billy Crystal, comedian, actor, producer, writer, director, and 1970 alumnus of the Tisch School of the Arts.
John Lewis, courageous leader of the U.S. civil rights movement and a Member of Congress since 1986.
Margaret Marshall, former Chief Justice of the Supreme Judicial Court of Massachusetts and the first woman to hold that position, wrote the first high court opinion in the U.S. permitting same-sex marriage.
Bill Clinton, 42nd President of the United States.
Justin Trudeau, 23rd Prime Minister of Canada
Taylor Swift singer-songwriter

References 

Honorary degrees
New York University
New York University
Honorary degree recipients
Honorary degree recipients